Jiří Prskavec may refer to:

 Jiří Prskavec (canoeist, born 1993), Czech canoeist, son of canoeist, born 1972
 Jiří Prskavec (canoeist, born 1972), Czech canoeist, father of canoeist, born 1993